This is a list of countries by population in 1989, providing an overview of the world population before the fall of the Iron Curtain.

While the population data is almost exclusively dated 1989, political developments before the summer of 1990 are taken into account, including Yemeni unification and Namibian independence but not German reunification which was finalised only in October, the breakup of Yugoslavia and dissolution of the Soviet Union took place two years later, and the dissolution of Czechoslovakia three years later.

The numbers given in Aktuell '91 are fully compatible with the data given by the U.S. Census Bureau, where they can be compared, as the US Census Data refers to modern national borders instead of 1989 borders. Similar remarks apply to 1990 estimates in the List of countries by past and future population which also only apply to modern-day national borders. See also Soviet Census (1989) and 1990 United States Census for comparison.

See also
 List of countries
 List of countries by area 
 List of countries and dependencies by area in 1989
 List of countries by past and future population
 List of countries by population
 List of countries by population in 1900
 List of countries by population in 2000
 List of countries by population in 2005
 List of countries by population in 2010
 List of continents by population
 List of religious populations
 World population
 Human geography
 United Nations

References

External links

1989
1989-related lists